Isadora Moon is a series of books by Harriet Muncaster for children aged 5–8. Each book is a stand-alone story about Isadora Moon, who is "half fairy, half vampire, totally unique!" The stories celebrate her mixed family heritage, and in February 2020, 300 bookshops and libraries in the UK celebrated “Isadora Moon Day”.

The first book was published in 2016; its "supernatural take on the classic 'be yourself' narrative" commenced a series that has since been translated into 30 languages and has sold over 1.2 million copies globally, 40% of which in Spain. In 2020, Kelebek Media bought rights to animate the stories. There are 16 books in the series; the latest was published in October 2022, and The next is due in spring 2023.

References 

Children's books
Fairies
Vampires